CSB or csb can refer to:

Organisations 
 Civil Service Bureau of Hong Kong
 CSB Bank an Indian Bank based out of Thrissur, Kerala formerly known as Catholic Syrian Bank
 Canadian Society for Biomechanics
 Congregation of St. Basil
 Christian Service Brigade, a non-denominational Christian organization for men and boys in the United States and Canada.
 Crime Scene Boyz, a rap collective from Harlesden, London.
 Garda Crime and Security Branch (CSB), the national intelligence agency of the Garda Síochána, Ireland's police force
 Chitrapur Saraswat Brahmin
 U.S. Chemical Safety and Hazard Investigation Board
 Confédération Syndicale Burkinabé, the Trade Union Confederation of Burkina
 Trade Union Confederation of Burundi (Confédération Syndicale du Burundi), a trade union confederation in Burundi
 21 Air (ICAO:CSB), an American cargo airline from the United States based in Greensboro, North Carolina

Schools 
 Cambridge School of Bucharest in Romania
 Cree School Board, a school district in northern Quebec, Canada
 Connecticut School of Broadcasting, an American education institute.
 Christian Science Board of Lectureship, a teacher of Christian Science Church
 Cercle Sportif Brugeois, an old name of Cercle Brugge
 Central School of Ballet
 Cathedral School for Boys in San Francisco
 Colegio San Benito in Puerto Rico
 De La Salle–College of Saint Benilde, of Manila

People 
 Chen Shui-bian, the former president of Taiwan
 Carlos Salvador Bilardo, football coach from Argentina

Science, mathematics, and technology 
 Client Side Blazor, .NET Code execution on browser side via WebAssembly
 An alias for ERCC6, a gene involved in Cockayne syndrome
 Collection of Computer Science Bibliographies
 Compressed soil block (compressed earth block), a building material 
 Csb: warm-summer Mediterranean climate, under Köppen climate classification

Other 
 California Shuttle Bus a passenger service between the San Francisco Bay Area and the Los Angeles area
 Canada Savings Bond
 Carshalton Beeches railway station, England; National Rail station code CSB
 Chinese Study Bible, a study Bible adapted from the ESV Study Bible
 Christian Standard Bible, a translation of the Bible in contemporary English
 Kashubian language (ISO 639-2 code)